Morag is the nickname given to a loch monster believed by many to live in Loch Morar, Scotland. After Nessie, it is among the most written about of Scotland's legendary monsters.  "Morag", a Scottish female name, is a pun on the name of the loch. Reported sightings date back to 1887, and numbered 34 incidents by 1981. Sixteen of these involved multiple witnesses.

A widely reported claim involved two local men, Duncan McDonell and William Simpson, and their boat, with which they claimed to have accidentally struck the creature, prompting it to attack them. McDonell defended with an oar, and Simpson opened fire with his rifle, whereupon it sank slowly out of sight.

See also
 Muc-sheilch (Loch Maree and environs)

References

Further reading
 Campbell, Elizabeth Montgomery & David Solomon, The Search for Morag (Tom Stacey 1972) 
 Peter Costello, In Search of Lake Monsters (Garnstone) 1974
 Modern Mysteries of Britain (Guild Publishing 1987), pp 160–1 (Morag photographs)

Lochaber
Scottish folklore
Scottish legendary creatures
Water monsters